Alan Goad (born 22 September 1954) is a former Australian rules footballer who played with Hawthorn in the VFL.

A rover, Goad was a premiership player in 1976, kicking 2 goals in Hawthorn's grand final win over North Melbourne. He was often battling to keep his spot in the side due to the strength of the Hawks during the 1970s and spent the 1978 season in the reserves, winning the Gardiner Medal.

External links

1954 births
Living people
Australian rules footballers from Victoria (Australia)
Hawthorn Football Club players
Hawthorn Football Club Premiership players
One-time VFL/AFL Premiership players